The LCDR C class or Europa Class was a class of  steam locomotives of the London, Chatham and Dover Railway (LCDR). The class was designed by William Martley and introduced in 1873, intended for the heaviest express services between London and Dover.

History
The LCDR was successful in winning a government contract for the delivery of British mails to the Continent from the South Eastern Railway (SER) in 1873 and required a new class of locomotives for the mail trains as the punctuality of these services was essential to its retention. William Martley the locomotive superintendent of the railway designed the class and obtained permission for four locomotives to be built by Sharp, Stewart and Company at a cost of £2,930 per locomotive to be delivered by October 1873. These were named Europa, Asia, Africa and America but were unnumbered.

The locomotives performed well and Martley therefore sought authority to purchase a further five, but this request was refused. He was however granted authority to build the locomotives at the company’s own Longhedge workshops in 1874. Work on two of these had barely started at the time of Martley’s death in the same year. Construction of these was halted, but eventually restarted and completed in 1876 by Martley’s successor William Kirtley, although the order for the three remaining examples was cancelled. The boilers for these three were later used by Kirtley for other purposes.

The two new locomotives were numbered 57 and 58 and the remaining members of the class were numbered 53-56. These numbers were increased by 459 to become 512–517 following the amalgamation of the LCDR and SER  to become the South Eastern and Chatham Railway in 1899. Under William Kirtley's classification scheme the locomotives became the 'C class'.

Use
The class were used on both the Dover-Calais boat trains and after May 1876 on new services to Flushing via Queenborough Pier. After 1876 they were replaced on the heaviest services by the LCDR M class  although they continued to be used on express services until the turn of the century and were considered to be sufficiently useful to be worth re-boilering between 1890 and 1892.

Withdrawal
The class began to be withdrawn and scrapped from December 1907 and all were gone by April 1909. The four earliest examples had then each completed a mileage of more than one million miles.

References

 

Europa
2-4-0 locomotives
Railway locomotives introduced in 1873
Scrapped locomotives
Sharp Stewart locomotives